All Our Exes Live in Texas  is an Australian folk group, consisting of Hannah Crofts (vocals & ukulele), Georgia Mooney (vocals & mandolin), Elana Stone (vocals & accordion) and Katie Wighton (vocals & guitar).
The four artists combined at an O Brother Where Art Thou show in 2014. The group name was chosen from a George Strait song to be funny and ironical.

At the ARIA Music Awards of 2017, the group won ARIA Award for Best Blues and Roots Album, for the critically acclaimed debut album When We Fall.

All Our Exes Live In Texas have toured with Midnight Oil, The Backstreet Boys, Passenger, Nathaniel Rateliff & The Night Sweats, Tiny Ruins, Megan Washington, Kate Miller-Heidke and Mama Kin.

Discography

Studio albums

Extended plays

Singles

Awards and nominations

AIR Awards
The Australian Independent Record Awards (commonly known informally as AIR Awards) is an annual awards night to recognise, promote and celebrate the success of Australia's Independent Music sector.

|-
| AIR Awards of 2018
|When We Fall 
| Best Independent Blues and Roots Album
| 
|-

APRA Awards
The APRA Awards are presented annually from 1982 by the Australasian Performing Right Association (APRA), "honouring composers and songwriters".

! 
|-
| 2018 
| "Cadillac" (Katherine Wighton, Hannah Crofts, Georgia Mooney, Elana Stone)
| Song of the Year
| 
| 
|-

ARIA Music Awards
The ARIA Music Awards is an annual awards ceremony that recognises excellence, innovation, and achievement across all genres of Australian music. 

|-
| 2017
|When We Fall 
| Best Blues & Roots Album
| 
|-

National Live Music Awards
The National Live Music Awards (NLMAs) are a broad recognition of Australia's diverse live industry, celebrating the success of the Australian live scene. The awards commenced in 2016.

|-
| National Live Music Awards of 2016
| themselves 
| Live Roots Act of the Year
| 
|-
| rowspan="3" |  National Live Music Awards of 2017
| rowspan="3" |  themselves 
| Live Country or Folk Act of the Year
| 
|-
| International Live Achievement (Group)
| 
|-
| Best Live Act of the Year - People's Choice
| 
|-
| rowspan="2" |  National Live Music Awards of 2018
| themselves 
| Live Blues and Roots Act of the Year
| 
|-
| Hannah Marjorie Crofts (All Our Exes Live in Texas)
| Live Instrumentalist of the Year
| 
|-

External links
 All Our Exes Live in Texas @ Discogs
 All Our Exes Live in Texas @ The Ladies Network

References

2014 establishments in Australia
ARIA Award winners
Musical groups established in 2014
Musical groups from Sydney
Australian indie folk groups
All-female bands